Mikael Simonsen (20 November 1882 – 29 March 1950) was a Danish rower who competed in the 1912 Summer Olympics. He was a crew member of the Danish boat, which won the bronze medal in the coxed four. Amongst many other rowing accomplishments, he also won Single Scull at the Baltic Games (Baltiska Spelen) 1914 in Mamloe, Sweden.

References

External links
Profile at databaseOlympics

1882 births
1950 deaths
Danish male rowers
Rowers at the 1912 Summer Olympics
Olympic rowers of Denmark
Olympic bronze medalists for Denmark
Olympic medalists in rowing
Medalists at the 1912 Summer Olympics